Beverley has been the name of a parliamentary constituency in the East Riding of Yorkshire for three periods. From medieval times until 1869 it was a parliamentary borough consisting of a limited electorate of property owners of its early designated borders within the market town of Beverley, which returned (elected) two Members of Parliament to the House of Commons of the English and Welsh-turned-UK Parliament during that period (sometimes called burgesses).

A form of a Beverley seat was revived for a single-member county constituency created in 1950, abolished in 1955, and similarly between the 1983 and 1992 general elections inclusive after which the area was largely incorporated into one 1997-created seat Beverley and Holderness; the remainder of the seat contributed to two other late 20th century-created seats.

History

The Parliamentary Borough
Beverley was first represented in the Model Parliament of 1295, but after 1306 it did not elect members again until 1563. Thereafter it maintained two members until being disfranchised in 1870. The borough consisted of the three parishes of the town of Beverley, and by 1831 had a population of 7,432 and 1,928 houses. The right of election was vested not in the population as a whole, but in the freemen of the borough, whether resident or not; at the contested election of 1826, 2,276 votes were cast. 
The borough was large enough to retain two members under the compromise of the Reform Act of 1832 when its boundaries were slightly extended to include some outlying fringes, increasing the population by roughly 800.  The first of three progressive Acts, by the third Act in 1885 were such boroughs more equally thus fairly apportioned.

For much of the borough's history, elections in Beverley were notorious for their corruption. In 1727, one of the victorious candidates was unseated on petition, his agents were imprisoned and Parliament passed a new Bribery Act as a result. Between 1857 and 1868 six petitions were lodged against election results, of which three succeeded in voiding the election and unseating one or more of the victors. After the 1868 election, the writ for the borough was suspended and a Royal Commission appointed to inquire into the conduct of elections in Beverley; when it reported that it had found proof of extensive bribery, an Act of Parliament was passed permanently depriving Beverley of the right to return Members of Parliament, abolishing the constituency and incorporating it within the East Riding constituency.

The novelist Anthony Trollope was one of the defeated candidates in the final corrupt election for which Beverley was disfranchised. He drew on his experience directly for his description of the Percycross election in his novel Ralph the Heir, and also told the story in his Autobiography. He found that corruption was taken for granted and that the price of a vote was between 15 shillings and £1. His unsuccessful campaign cost him £400. Sir Henry Edwards and Edmund Hegan Kennard were those candidates deemed elected Members of Parliament in this final contest for the constituency.

1950 to 1955
The Beverley constituency which existed from 1950 to 1955 was a predominantly rural one. Under the boundary revisions introduced by the Representation of the People Act 1948, which came into effect at the 1950 general election, the three existing county constituencies of the East Riding were abolished, and the county was divided into two new constituencies, each named after their biggest towns - Bridlington and Beverley. The new Beverley constituency comprised the western half of the Riding. This encompassed parts of all three of the county's previously existing constituencies (Buckrose, Holderness and Howdenshire).

The Beverley constituency was abolished in further boundary changes implemented at the 1955 general election, being divided between the new Haltemprice and Howden seats.

1983 to 1997
Beverley again became a constituency name in 1983, this time for a constituency mostly suburban in character. The new constituency replaced, and strongly resembled, the Haltemprice constituency which had been introduced in 1955: its main components apart from Beverley were the prosperous suburbs to the north and west of Hull, such as Cottingham, Anlaby and Kirk Ella.

The Beverley constituency was abolished in 1997 general election, Beverley itself moving to the new Beverley and Holderness constituency.

Boundaries
1950–1955: The Borough of Beverley, the Urban District of Norton, and the Rural Districts of Beverley, Derwent, Howden, Norton, and Pocklington.

1983–1997: The East Yorkshire Borough of Beverley wards of Anlaby, Brough, Castle, Hessle East, Hessle West, Kirk Ella, Leconfield, Leven, Mill Beck and Croxby, Minster North, Minster South, Molescroft, Priory, St Mary's East, St Mary's West, Springfield, Swanland, Tickton, Willerby, and Woodmansey.

Members of Parliament

Beverley borough

1563–1660

1660–1869

Writ suspended 1869, constituency abolished 1870

Beverley County Constituency (1950–1955)

Beverley County Constituency (1983–1997)

Elections

Elections in the 1830s

Elections in the 1840s
Lane-Fox resigned by accepting the office of Steward of the Chiltern Hundreds, causing a by-election.

Elections in the 1850s

 
 
 
  

Lawley resigned after he was found to have been using his position as secretary to the Chancellor of the Exchequer for insider trading, causing a by-election.

 
 
 

 

 
 

  

 

Glover's election was declared void on petition, after he was found to have lied about meeting the required property qualifications, causing a by-election.

Elections in the 1860s
Walters' election was declared void on petition.

 
 

 
 

 

 

A Royal Commission was appointed to investigate the seat and, after finding extensive bribery, the borough's writ was suspended, the election result voided, and the seat was absorbed into East Riding of Yorkshire.

Elections in the 1950s

Elections in the 1980s

Elections in the 1990s

See also
List of parliamentary constituencies in Humberside

Notes and references

Sources
F W S Craig, "British Parliamentary Election Results 1832-1885" (2nd edition, Aldershot: Parliamentary Research Services, 1989)
D Brunton & D H Pennington, “Members of the Long Parliament” (London: George Allen & Unwin, 1954)
Michael Kinnear, "The British Voter" (London: Batsford, 1968)
H G Nicholas, "To The Hustings" (London: Cassell & Co., 1956)
J Holladay Philbin, "Parliamentary Representation 1832 - England and Wales" (New Haven: Yale University Press, 1965)
Henry Stooks Smith, "The Parliaments of England from 1715 to 1847" (2nd edition, edited by FWS Craig - Chichester: Parliamentary Reference Publications, 1973)
Robert Waller, "The Almanac of British Politics" (3rd edition, London: Croom Helm, 1987)
 Frederic A Youngs, jr, "Guide to the Local Administrative Units of England, Vol II" (London: Royal Historical Society, 1991)
 Victoria County History of the East Riding of Yorkshire
"Beverley, 1700-1835 - Parliamentary Elections" from the Victoria County History

Parliamentary constituencies of the East Riding of Yorkshire (defunct)
Constituencies of the Parliament of the United Kingdom established in 1563
Constituencies of the Parliament of the United Kingdom disestablished in 1870
Constituencies of the Parliament of the United Kingdom established in 1950
Constituencies of the Parliament of the United Kingdom disestablished in 1955
Constituencies of the Parliament of the United Kingdom established in 1983
Constituencies of the Parliament of the United Kingdom disestablished in 1997
Parliamentary constituencies disenfranchised for corruption
Beverley